Tendon is a commune in the Vosges area of Grand Est in northeastern France.  Its inhabitants are known as Todas, there is a village and around 60 settlements in the area. The history of the area dates back to the middle ages.

Geography

Tendon is a comune in the heart of a long valley, composed of a village and about 60 settlements. Situated 19 kilometres to the East of Épinal, Tendon lies in the valley of the Scouet, a tributary of the Vologne via the Barba. 492 hectares are occupied by forest. Le Tholy is 8 km away via the Bonne Fontaine col at an elevation of 677 m.

History
The ban of Tendon (Tandon), comprising the villages of Tendon, Houx, Laveline, Dehiex, Chamontaruz and La Poirie, belonged to the bailiwick of Remiremont under the Ancien Régime and depended on the mastery of the waters and forests Épinal. It followed the dress of Lorraine.

In the church, the inhabitants of the current parish of Tendon were part of that of Docelles. This ended on 3 September 1707 when the bishop  of Toul elevated the small Tendon chapel, which had been built 25 years earlier, into a parish. The bishop's decision was confirmed by the Pope in 1715, against opposition from the bishop of Metz who imagined himself to be in charge of the region. Tendon was part of the prévôté of Arches.

Established as a commune in 1790, Tendon was part of the canton  of Éloyes in the district, then arrondissement, of Remiremont. After the an IX, the commune was reattached to the Remiremont canton in the arrondissement of Remiremont.

Personalities
Father Voyaux de Franoux, born in 1760, was the founder of a girls school in 1825 and a hospital in 1834 in his native village. 
Educated at the collège de Saint-Claude, in Toul, he studied philosophy and theology in the Saint-Dié-des-Vosges Catholic seminary, then was sent to the Sorbonne by his bishop, where he received the grade of doctor. He was ordained as a priest and became head of the Trente-trois seminary Paris. During the French revolution, he emigrated to England where he was appointed apostolic vicar. After the restoration of the French monarchy, Louis XVIII made him almoner of the French embassy in London and canon of the Chapter of Saint-Denis.

Features
 The Grande Cascade and Petite Cascade of Tendon, the first upstream, at an elevation of 32 metres in the heart of the forest of firs.
 The rocks of la Moulure.

Administration

Demography

Heraldry

See also
Communes of the Vosges department

References

External links 

 The streams of Tendon

Communes of Vosges (department)